Johann Gottfried Donati (Leipzig, 1706Greiz, 1782) was a German Baroque composer. Donati's father and grandfather were organ-builders in Saxony. He was organist in Greiz for 50 years and a friend of organ-builder Gottfried Silbermann.

Works, editions and recordings
Partial cantata cycles for 1737, 1742, and 1745 - mainly lost in the Greiz town fire in 1802, but a few copies survive in Mügeln and Bösenrode parish churches. His passions and chamber works are not preserved.
Cantata Mein Hertzens-Haus bereite dich Klaus Mertens, Accademia Daniel, dir Shalev Ad-El, 2007.

References

1706 births
1782 deaths
Musicians from Leipzig
German organists
German male organists
German Baroque composers
18th-century classical composers
18th-century keyboardists
German classical composers
German male classical composers
18th-century German composers
18th-century German male musicians